Yahor Aliaksandravich Salabutau (born January 24, 1984) is a Belarusian former swimmer, who specialized in freestyle events. Salabutau qualified for the men's 200 m freestyle at the 2004 Summer Olympics in Athens, by clearing a FINA B-standard entry time of 1:51.23 from the Belarus Open Championships in Minsk. He challenged seven other swimmers on the fourth heat, including two-time Olympians Joshua Ilika Brenner of Mexico and Giancarlo Zolezzi of Chile. He raced to sixth place by three hundredths of a second (0.03) behind Algeria's Mahrez Mebarek in 1:53.03. Salabutau failed to advance into the semifinals, as he placed thirty-seventh overall in the preliminaries.

References

1984 births
Living people
Belarusian male freestyle swimmers
Olympic swimmers of Belarus
Swimmers at the 2004 Summer Olympics
Sportspeople from Minsk